Brick Livin' is the debut album by the rapper Mr. Marcelo. It was released on July 25, 2000, through No Limit Records. It was produced by Carlos Stephens, Donald XL Robertson, Suga Bear and Ke'Noe. Though it was met with positive reviews, Brick Livin''' failed to advance high on the charts, making it to only No. 172 on the Billboard 200. It also peaked at No. 43 on the Top R&B/Hip-Hop Albums and No. 9 on the Top Heatseekers. It is Mr. Marcelo's only album on No Limit Records.

Critical reception
AllMusic wrote that "what listeners will find is a refreshing approach to increasingly generic motifs that could be the most enthusiastic record to bear the No Limit stamp since Master P's breakthrough album, Ghetto D''.

Track listing
"How U Like It"- 2:10 (featuring Master P) 
"Somet'in"- 4:10 (featuring Krazy) 
"Hold Up"- 3:46  (featuring Erica Foxx)
"Ha Brah"- 3:15  (featuring DoeDoe & Wango)
"Live By It"- 3:35 (featuring Mac) 
"GTO"- 2:47 (featuring C-Murder) 
"Wildin'"- 2:23 (featuring Master P) 
"Let's Do It"- 3:14 (featuring Ghetto Commission) 
"Live It Up"- 2:50  (featuring Ke'noe)
"Hot Shit"- 3:27  
"Sound da Alarm"- 4:16  (featuring Jacko & DoeDoe)
"Brick Livin"- 4:08  
"Y'all N's"- 3:29  
"Soldiers for Life"- 3:02 (featuring Samm & D.I.G.)  
"U Never Know"- 4:35  
"Southern Funk"- 4:07  
"Me & My Girl"- 3:45  (featuring Marijuana)
"187"- 3:47  (featuring Badd Boyz)

References

2000 debut albums
No Limit Records albums
Priority Records albums
Mr. Marcelo albums